GNU is a Unix-like computer operating system developed by the GNU Project.

GNU or gnu may also refer to:

Science and technology
 Gnu, or wildebeests, a genus of antelopes
 GNU Project, a free software, mass collaboration project 
 9965 GNU, an asteroid

Organisations
 government of national unity, a coalition government during a national emergency 
 Government of National Unity (Libya), a transitional unitary government during 2021
 Government of National Unity (South Africa), a constitutional arrangement
 Grand National Union of Kenya, a Kenyan political party
 Great Northern Union, a US men's barbershop chorus
 Gyeongsang National University, a university in South Korea

Other uses
 Gnau language, by ISO 639-3 language code
 Gnu Snowboards, produced by Mervin Manufacturing in the US
 Goodnews Airport, Alaska, US, by IATA and FAA LID codes
 Sopwith Gnu, a 1910s British touring biplane
 "The Gnu", a song by Flanders and Swann
 A fairy chess piece used in Wildebeest chess
 The Gnus, an upper-school student newspaper of Sandy Spring Friends School
 The Gnu Theatre, a Los Angeles theatre designed and built by Jeff Seymour
 The Gnu, a pub in North Newbald, England
 Gary Gnu, fictional character in The Great Space Coaster

See also
 Gnu goat, or Takin, a goat-antelope found in the eastern Himalayas
 Gnu High, an album by Canadian musician Kenny Wheeler
 GNU license (disambiguation)